Mario Mylius (21 October 1912 – 13 January 1980) was a Swiss equestrian. He competed in two events at the 1936 Summer Olympics.

References

1912 births
1980 deaths
Swiss male equestrians
Olympic equestrians of Switzerland
Equestrians at the 1936 Summer Olympics
Place of birth missing
20th-century Swiss people